Veselka may  refer to: 

Veselka
Veselka (surname)
Veselka Pevec